David Edgar "King" Bernard (born September 26, 1912, died July 17, 1973) was an American football player who played two seasons in the NFL  with the Cleveland Rams.

Early life
Bernard  was born in Jefferson, South Dakota and attended Central High School in Sioux City, Iowa.

He  matriculated at the University of Mississippi (Ole Miss).

Football  career
Bernard played two seasons for the Cleveland Rams in 1944 and 1945.  Previously, in 1942 he had briefly been on the roster of the Pittsburgh Steelers, but never saw action. Bernard also played in 1942 with the minor-league Wilmington Clippers of the American Association.

References

External links

1912 births
Players of American football from South Dakota
American football running backs
American football quarterbacks
Ole Miss Rebels football players
Pittsburgh Steelers players
Cleveland Rams players
1973 deaths
Wilmington Clippers players